Lü Meng (178 – January or February 220), courtesy name Ziming, was a Chinese military general and politician who served under the warlord Sun Quan during the late Eastern Han dynasty of China. Early in his career, he fought in several battles under the banner of Sun Ce, Sun Quan's elder brother and predecessor. Although he had been noted for his bravery, he was still deemed as nothing more than a "mere warrior" for his lack of literacy skills. Later, with encouragement from Sun Quan, Lü Meng took up scholarly pursuits to improve himself, gradually becoming a learned and competent military leader. In 217, he succeeded Lu Su as the frontline commander of Sun Quan's forces in Jing Province. Two years later, in a carefully calculated military operation, Lü Meng led an invasion of Liu Bei's territories in southern Jing Province, swiftly and stealthily capturing all the lands from Liu Bei's general Guan Yu, who was captured and executed after his defeat. Lü Meng enjoyed his finest hour after the victory but died a few months later because he was already seriously ill before the campaign.

Early life
Lü Meng was from Fupo County, Runan Commandery, which is located southeast of present-day Funan County, Anhui. His family migrated to the south of the Yangtze River when Lü Meng was young. Lü Meng lived with his brother-in-law, Deng Dang, who served as a military officer under Sun Ce. When he was 14 or 15, he secretly followed Deng Dang to the battles against the Shanyue tribes. Deng Dang was shocked to see his teenage brother-in-law in battle, so he scolded Lü Meng and warned him to stop. Lü Meng refused to listen so Deng Dang told Lü Meng's mother about this. When she wanted to punish him, Lü Meng said: "It is difficult to survive in poverty. If we can prove ourselves through hard work, then wealth will come eventually. How can we catch the tiger cub if we don't enter the tiger's den?" Lü Meng's mother sighed and let him have his way.

At the time, an official scorned Lü Meng because of his young age and often insulted him by saying things like: "What can he do? His behaviour will only result in him feeding himself to the tigers." Lü Meng killed the official one day when he lost control of his anger. Initially, he took shelter under Zheng Chang but later turned himself in to Yuan Xiong, a colonel under Sun Ce. Yuan Xiong pleaded with his lord to spare Lü Meng's life. Sun Ce interviewed Lü Meng and was so impressed with him that he pardoned Lü Meng and appointed him as a close aide.

A few years later, after Deng Dang died, Zhang Zhao recommended Lü Meng to replace Deng Dang, so Lü Meng was appointed as a Major of a Separate Command. In the year 200, after Sun Ce was assassinated, his younger brother Sun Quan succeeded him as the warlord ruling the territories in the Jiangdong region. Sun Quan planned to reorganise his army by merging small units into larger garrisons. When Lü Meng heard about it, he collected funds to purchase elaborately designed armour for his troops. When Sun Quan came to inspect Lü Meng's unit, he was so impressed that he placed more soldiers under Lü Meng's command, thus saving Lü Meng's troops from being merged into another unit.

Lü Meng participated in Sun Quan's conquest of Danyang Commandery (丹楊郡; around present-day Xuancheng, Anhui) and made many contributions in battle. He was promoted to Commandant Who Pacifies the North and appointed as the Chief of Guangde County.

Battle of Jiangxia

In the spring of 208, Lü Meng was assigned to be the navy commandant when Sun Quan launched a campaign against Huang Zu, the Administrator of Jiangxia Commandery (present-day eastern Hubei). During the battle, Ling Tong and Dong Xi destroyed Huang Zu's two large mengchongs while Lü Meng's unit defeated Huang Zu's navy. Lü Meng killed Huang Zu's subordinate Chen Jiu in the midst of battle. Huang Zu attempted to flee after learning of Chen Jiu's death, but was captured by Sun Quan's soldiers. After the battle, Sun Quan deemed Lü Meng's contributions to be the most significant because Chen Jiu's death secured their victory. Lü Meng was promoted to General of the Household Who Sweeps Across the Wilderness and awarded 10 million coins.

Red Cliffs campaign

In the winter of 208, Lü Meng participated in the Battle of Red Cliffs, in which the allied forces of Sun Quan and Liu Bei defeated the forces of the northern warlord Cao Cao at Wulin (烏林; in present-day Honghu, Hubei). Cao Cao perfunctorily retreated to northern China, leaving behind his general Cao Ren to defend Nan Commandery (南郡; around present-day Jingzhou, Hubei). Sun Quan's forces, led by Zhou Yu and Cheng Pu, pressed on their attack and besieged Cao Ren in Nan Commandery.

Around the time, Xi Su, a military officer from Yi Province (covering present-day Sichuan and Chongqing), brought along his men to defect to Sun Quan's side. Zhou Yu proposed to Sun Quan to let Lü Meng take charge of Xi Su's troops. However, Lü Meng praised Xi Su as a courageous person and declined to take over command of Xi Su's men. He believed it was disrespectful to do so because Xi Su had come a long way to join them. Sun Quan agreed with Lü Meng and returned Xi Su's troops to him.

During the siege of Nan Commandery, Zhou Yu ordered Gan Ning to lead a detachment to take control of Yiling (夷陵; present-day Yichang, Hubei), but Gan Ning came under attack by a separate enemy force led by Cao Ren's subordinates. When Gan Ning sent a messenger to Zhou Yu's camp to request for relief forces, most of Sun Quan's officers saw that they did not have enough men to spare, so they refused to help Gan Ning. Lü Meng, however, insisted on saving Gan Ning. He told Zhou Yu and Cheng Pu: "I suggest we leave Ling Tong behind while I follow you to help Gan Ning. It is imperative that we lift the siege (on Gan Ning) because he may not be able to hold out for long. I assure you that Ling Tong can defend our current position for at least ten days."

Lü Meng also suggested to Zhou Yu to send 300 men to block the enemy's retreat route with huge logs. When the reinforcements arrived at Yiling, they killed over half of the total number of enemy troops and forced the surviving ones to retreat at night. However, the enemy encountered the huge logs and were unable to cross over on horseback, so they had to dismount and proceed on foot. Sun Quan's pursuing forces arrived at the blockade and seized about 300 horses left behind by the enemy, which they transported back to their camp on boats. The morale of Zhou Yu's army improved greatly, so they crossed the Yangtze River, set up a garrison near the enemy base, and then engaged Cao Ren's forces in battle. Cao Ren lost the battle and eventually ordered his troops to abandon their position and retreat. Sun Quan's forces captured Nan Commandery and gained control over central Jing Province (covering present-day Hubei and Hunan). Upon his return, Lü Meng was promoted to Lieutenant-General and appointed as the Prefect of Xunyang County (尋陽縣; southwest of present-day Huangmei County, Hubei).

Scholarly pursuits
The Jiang Biao Zhuan recorded that Sun Quan once told Lü Meng and Jiang Qin: "Both of you are commanders now so you should enrich yourself with knowledge." Lü Meng replied: "I have many things to attend to in the army, so I am afraid I won't have time to read." Sun Quan then said:  Lü Meng was so inspired by Sun Quan's words that he began to study diligently and acquire more knowledge. He eventually surpassed some Confucian scholars in terms of the number of texts he read.

Meeting with Lu Su
In 210, after Lu Su succeeded Zhou Yu (who died of illness earlier that year) as the frontline commander of Sun Quan's forces, he passed by Lü Meng's garrison on his way to Lukou (陸口; at Lushui Lake near present-day Chibi, Hubei). Lu Su had all along regarded Lü Meng with contempt, but someone told him: "General Lü's fame and glory are increasing day by day. You shouldn't view him in the same light now as you did in the past. You should visit him soon." Lu Su then headed to Lü Meng's camp. After some drinks, Lü Meng asked Lu Su, "You have received an important appointment and you are going to be stationed near Guan Yu. Have you made any contingency plans to deal with unforeseen circumstances?" Lu Su lackadaisically replied, "I will adapt to the situation when the time comes." Lü Meng then said: "The east and the west may be one family now, but Guan Yu is a person with the might of bears and tigers. How can you not make preparations beforehand?" Lü Meng then proposed five strategies to Lu Su on how to deal with Guan Yu. Lu Su left his seat, came closer to Lü Meng, placed his hand on his shoulder and said, "Lü Ziming, I never knew you had such insights until I came here." He also visited Lü Meng's mother and became friends with Lü Meng.

Jiang Biao Zhuan account
The Jiang Biao Zhuan recorded a slightly different account of the meeting between Lu Su and Lü Meng. Lu Su placed his hand on Lü Meng's shoulder and said: "I heard you were previously a mere warrior. But now, you have taken up scholarly pursuits and you are no longer that Meng under Wu." Lü Meng replied:  He then presented three strategies to Lu Su on how to counter Guan Yu. Lu Su respected Lü Meng so he kept the strategies to himself and did not reveal them.

The Chinese idioms "Ah Meng from Wu" and "rub one's eyes and look" originated from this conversation. The former is used to describe an unlearned person who achieves improvement through diligent study  while the latter means to see a person in a different light, especially after the person has made remarkable improvement.

Battles of Wan County and Ruxu

Cao Cao appointed Xie Qi as the Agricultural Officer of Qichun County and ordered him to station at Wan County (皖縣; present-day Qianshan County, Anhui) to harass the border of Sun Quan's domain. Lü Meng tried to induce Xie Qi into surrendering but failed, so he attacked Xie Qi. Xie Qi lost the battle and retreated. His subordinates, Sun Zicai and Song Hao, brought along several civilians and surrendered to Lü Meng.

In 213, Lü Meng followed Sun Quan to Ruxu (濡須; north of present-day Wuwei County, Anhui) to guard against Cao Cao's advances. Sun Quan wanted to construct a dock at Ruxu, but his subordinates said, "We should land on the other side of the river and attack the enemy, then return to our ships. Why build a dock?" However, Lü Meng supported the idea of building a dock and he said: "Battles are unpredictable and we might not always win. If we lose and the enemy closes in, and we don't have time to retreat to the riverbank, how can we even board our ships?" Sun Quan agreed with Lü Meng and had the dock constructed to make boardings and landings more convenient. With this, Sun Quan's army defended their positions against Cao Cao's approaching forces, who retreated after several failed attempts to overcome the enemy.

Battle of Lujiang
Around 214, Cao Cao retreated from Ruxu, he appointed Zhu Guang as the Administrator of Lujiang Commandery (廬江郡; around present-day Lujiang County, Anhui) and ordered him to station at Wan County (皖縣; present-day Qianshan County, Anhui). Zhu Guang developed the area for agricultural use, while bribing bandits from Poyang County to cause trouble in Sun Quan's territories. Lü Meng warned Sun Quan: "The lands in Wan County are very fertile so the enemy's numbers will rise after they gain a bountiful harvest. Within a few years time, Cao Cao's military prowess would have increased significantly, so we should eliminate them soon." Sun Quan heeded Lü Meng's advice and personally led a campaign to attack Lujiang Commandery. Before the battle, Sun Quan summoned all his officers and asked them for their opinions.

The officers suggested to pile up earth to form small hills and replenish their equipment. However, Lü Meng disagreed: "It will take several days to build the hills and replenish our equipment. By then, the enemy would have reinforced their defences and their relief forces would have arrived, and we can't defeat them. The rainwater has flowed in, and the water level will subside if we linger on for days. By then, it will be very difficult for our ships to retreat and we may be in danger. As of now, I observe that the fortress's defences are weak, so we can achieve victory if we attack it from all directions when our army's morale is still high. We can retreat via the water route after that. That's the way to secure total victory." Sun Quan heeded Lü Meng's suggestion.

Lü Meng recommended Gan Ning to lead the assault on Wan County while he followed behind with the elite troops. When they attacked at dawn, Lü Meng himself beat a war drum to boost the soldiers' morale. They captured the fortress by noon. Around the same time, Cao Cao's general Zhang Liao was leading reinforcements from Hefei to help Zhu Guang. When he reached Jiashi, he heard that Wan County had fallen to the enemy so he withdrew his troops. Sun Quan praised Lü Meng for his bravery and appointed him as the Administrator of Lujiang Commandery. Lü Meng gained 600 households from Xunyang County (尋陽縣; southwest of present-day Huangmei County, Hubei) for his tuntian system and had 30 more subordinates placed under his command.

When Lü Meng returned to Xunyang County, he heard that some bandits were causing trouble in Luling Commandery (廬陵郡; southwest of present-day Ji'an, Jiangxi), and that many of Sun Quan's officers had been unsuccessful in defeating the bandits. Sun Quan remarked: "A hundred birds of prey are not comparable to one osprey." He then ordered Lü Meng to attack the bandits. Lü Meng achieved success and killed the bandit chiefs but released the others and allowed them to revert to normal civilian life.

Sun–Liu territorial dispute

Around 212, Sun Quan's ally Liu Bei embarked on a campaign to seize control of Yi Province (covering present-day Sichuan and Chongqing) from its governor, Liu Zhang. He left Guan Yu behind to defend his territories in southern Jing Province during his absence. After Liu Bei completely took over Yi Province in 214, Sun Quan perceived that he was "lending" territories in Jing Province to Liu Bei per an earlier agreement in 210 so he wanted the territories back because Liu Bei already had a new base in Yi Province. When Liu Bei refused, Sun Quan ordered Lü Meng to lead troops to seize three commanderies – Changsha, Lingling (零陵; around present-day Yongzhou, Hunan) and Guiyang (桂陽; around present-day Chenzhou, Hunan).

Lü Meng wrote to the administrators of the three commanderies to ask them to submit to Sun Quan. They all agreed except Lingling's administrator, Hao Pu. Liu Bei returned to Jing Province when he heard of Lü Meng's advances and garrisoned troops at Gong'an County while ordering Guan Yu to lead an army to take back the three commanderies. At the time, Sun Quan was at Lukou (陸口; at Lushui Lake near present-day Chibi, Hubei) and he sent Lu Su to lead 10,000 troops to Yiyang to block Guan Yu. Sun Quan also sent an urgent order to Lü Meng, ordering him to give up on Lingling and lead his troops to Yiyang to assist Lu Su.

When Lü Meng pacified Changsha, he passed by Ling County (酃縣; east of present-day Hengyang, Hunan) and met Deng Xuanzhi, an old friend of Hao Pu. He planned to use Deng Xuanzhi to trick Hao Pu into surrendering. That night, Lü Meng summoned all his officers and gave them instructions on how to attack Lingling the following morning, without telling them that Sun Quan had given orders for them to give up on Lingling and move to Yiyang. He lied to Deng Xuanzhi that Liu Bei was besieged in Hanzhong by Cao Cao's general Xiahou Yuan and that Guan Yu was occupied in a battle at Nan Commandery. He then asked Deng Xuanzhi to help him persuade Hao Pu to give up on Lingling. Deng Xuanzhi went to see Hao Pu later and conveyed Lü Meng's message. Hao Pu became afraid when he heard that he had been isolated, so he agreed to surrender and asked Deng Xuanzhi to lead him to Lü Meng. When Lü Meng met Hao Pu, he revealed the truth, clapped his hands and laughed. Hao Pu became wrecked with guilt when he learnt that both Liu Bei and Guan Yu were actually free to reinforce Lingling but it was too late. Lü Meng left Sun He behind to guard the three commanderies while he headed towards Yiyang per Sun Quan's order.

The territorial dispute between Sun Quan and Liu Bei was eventually resolved when both sides agreed to divide Jing Province between their respective domains along the Xiang River. Sun Quan released Hao Pu and returned Lingling Commandery to Liu Bei. Lü Meng received Xunyang and Yangxin counties as his personal estate.

Battles of Xiaoyao Ford and Ruxu

In 214, after returning from Jing Province, Lü Meng joined Sun Quan in a campaign to conquer Hefei, which was defended by Cao Cao's general Zhang Liao. By 215, Sun Quan's forces had failed to breach Hefei's walls and had also sustained heavy casualties in the earlier engagements with the enemy. When a plague broke out in his army, Sun Quan decided to withdraw. While retreating, Sun Quan was caught up in a fierce counterattack by Zhang Liao, but managed to break out of the encirclement and reach safety when his officers, including Lü Meng, fought with their lives to protect their lord at all costs.

Later, in 217, Cao Cao personally led a large army to invade Sun Quan's garrison at Ruxu (濡須; north of present-day Wuwei County, Anhui). Sun Quan led his forces to resist the enemy and placed Lü Meng in charge of the army. Lü Meng arrived at the dock, which was constructed earlier in 213, and stationed thousands of archers there to rain arrows on the enemy when they approached. He also attacked the camp of Cao Cao's vanguard force before the enemy established a foothold and succeeding in destroying the camp. Cao Cao saw that he could not overcome Sun Quan and eventually retreated. Lü Meng was promoted to General of Tiger's Might and appointed as Left Protector of the Army.

Succeeding Lu Su
In 217, when Lu Su died, Lü Meng took over command of the former's troops, numbering over 10,000, and moved west to the garrison at Lukou (陸口; at Lushui Lake near present-day Chibi, Hubei). Lü Meng was also appointed as the Administrator of Hanchang Commandery (漢昌郡; southeast of present-day Pingjiang County, Hunan) and received Xiajun, Liuyang, Hanchang and Zhouling counties as his personal marquisate. He was stationed near the Sun-Liu border, which was guarded by Liu Bei's general Guan Yu on the other side. Lü Meng was aware of Guan Yu's military prowess and his intention of seizing Sun Quan's territories in Jing Province. He also knew that Guan Yu was in a strategic position on the upstream of the Yangtze River. He recognised that the temporary stability and truce between Sun Quan and Liu Bei would not last long.

Previously, Lu Su had advocated the maintenance of friendly relations between Sun Quan and Liu Bei to sustain their alliance against Cao Cao. Lü Meng wrote a secret letter to Sun Quan: 

Sun Quan agreed with Lü Meng and wanted to accept his suggestion. Later, he sought Lü Meng's advice on attacking Cao Cao in Xu Province, to which Lü Meng replied:  Sun Quan thought that Lü Meng's advice was appropriate so he heeded it.

When Lü Meng was at Lukou, he treated his neighbours generously and maintained friendly ties with Guan Yu.

Invasion of Jing Province

In 219, Guan Yu led an army to attack Cao Cao's fortress at Fancheng (樊城; present-day Fancheng District, Xiangyang, Hubei), which was defended by Cao Ren. He left behind his subordinates Shi Ren and Mi Fang to defend Gong'an County and Nan Commandery (南郡; around present-day Jingzhou, Hubei) respectively. When Lü Meng heard about that, he wrote to Sun Quan:  Sun Quan agreed to Lü Meng's plan and played along by openly approving his request to return to Jianye for medical treatment.

Guan Yu fell for the ruse and withdrew the backup forces and advanced towards Fancheng. When Cao Cao heard of the attack at Fancheng, he sent Yu Jin to lead an army to relief Cao Ren, but Yu Jin lost the battle and surrendered to Guan Yu. Guan Yu's troops increased in numbers after his victory so he lacked food supplies. He sent his men to seize grain from one of Sun Quan's depots along the Xiang River. When Sun Quan heard about it, he sent Lü Meng ahead to invade Jing Province while he followed up behind. Lü Meng arrived at Xunyang County (尋陽縣; southwest of present-day Huangmei County, Hubei), where he ordered his elite soldiers to disguise themselves as merchants and sail towards Nan Commandery. On the journey, they captured the watchtowers set up by Guan Yu along the river to prevent the defenders from learning of their approach. Guan Yu was totally unaware of this. Shi Ren, who was defending Gong'an County, surrendered to Lü Meng after Yu Fan, an official under Sun Quan, persuaded him to do so. Earlier on, Guan Yu had punished Mi Fang for negligently causing some weapons to be destroyed in a fire. Although the incident was over, Mi Fang still feared Guan Yu. Lü Meng showed understanding towards Mi Fang and convinced him to surrender as well.

After entering Nan Commandery, Lü Meng treated the civilian population well, among whom included family members of Guan Yu's troops. He also gave strict orders to his men, forbidding them from disturbing the people. In one incident, Lü Meng executed one of his soldiers for stealing from a civilian household, even though that soldier was an old acquaintance of his. He shed tears after that. This incident shocked the other soldiers in Lü Meng's unit and they did not dare to defy his orders. Lü Meng won the hearts of the people by showing kindness towards them – he provided necessities such as food and clothing to the elderly and the poor, and distributed medicine to the sick. He also ordered the treasury in the commandery office to be sealed up while they awaited Sun Quan's arrival.

Guan Yu was returning to Nan Commandery when he heard that his territories in Jing Province had fallen to Lü Meng. He sent messengers to meet Lü Meng, who brought them on a tour of the city. When the messengers returned to Guan Yu, they spread the word that their families were well. Guan Yu's troops lost their fighting spirit after hearing that Lü Meng treated their families better than how Guan Yu treated them in the past. Guan Yu knew that he had lost and was isolated, so he withdrew to Maicheng (麥城; around present-day Maicheng Village, Lianghe Town, Dangyang, Hubei). When they reached Zhang District in the west, Guan Yu's men deserted and surrendered to Sun Quan's forces. Sun Quan sent Zhu Ran and Pan Zhang to block Guan Yu's retreat route. Guan Yu and his son Guan Ping were captured by Sun Quan's forces in an ambush and subsequently executed. Liu Bei lost all his territories in Jing Province to Sun Quan.

Death
For his achievements in the conquest of Jing Province, Lü Meng was appointed as the Administrator of Nan Commandery. He was also enfeoffed as the Marquis of Chanling and awarded 100 million coins and 500 jin of gold. Earlier on, Sun Quan threw a feast at Gong'an County to celebrate the victory, but Lü Meng did not want to attend because he was ill. Sun Quan laughed and said: "Ziming, you deserve the honour of capturing Guan Yu. You have achieved victory but haven't received any reward yet, so how can you leave now?" He ordered the soldiers to play music, and personally selected subordinates for Lü Meng and the equipment required for the ceremony. After the ceremony, all the soldiers lined up along the path when Lü Meng took his leave, with music playing in the background. That was Lü Meng's finest hour.

Lü Meng rejected the coins and gold, but Sun Quan insisted that he accept. He became ill again before he was enfeoffed as a marquis. Sun Quan was at Gong'an County then so he had Lü Meng brought to his personal residence to stay with him. He also offered 1,000 jin of gold as a reward to any person who could cure Lü Meng. Sun Quan became more worried as Lü Meng's condition deteriorated over time. He wanted to see Lü Meng but felt that it was too troublesome to keep moving around, so he had a hole drilled in the wall to observe Lü Meng's room. He was happy when he saw Lü Meng having his meals, but could not sleep at night when he saw that Lü Meng did not eat anything. When Lü Meng's condition improved slightly, he was so happy that he ordered his subjects to visit Lü Meng and wish him well. He even invited Taoist priests to perform rituals to increase Lü Meng's lifespan. Despite Sun Quan's efforts, Lü Meng eventually died in Gong'an County at the age of 42 (by East Asian age reckoning). Sun Quan was extremely grieved by Lü Meng's death. Before Lü Meng died, he had instructed his family to store all their prized possessions – including gifts from Sun Quan – in a vault and return them to his lord after his death. He had also asked for a simple funeral. Sun Quan felt even more sad when found out that Lü Meng had made such arrangements before his death.

Family
Lü Meng's marquis title was inherited by his son, Lü Ba. Lü Ba received 50 qing of land and 300 households to help him keep watch over his father's tomb. After Lü Ba died, his elder brother Lü Cong succeeded him and inherited the marquis title. Lü Cong, in turn, passed on the marquis title to his younger brother, Lü Mu, after his death.

Anecdotes

Incident with Cai Yi
In his younger days, Lü Meng was not competent in reading and writing. Whenever he issued orders, he had to verbally instruct his subordinates or ask someone to help him write. Cai Yi, the Administrator of Jiangxia Commandery, scorned him because of that. However, Lü Meng never hated Cai Yi for treating him with contempt. When Gu Shao, the Administrator of Yuzhang Commandery, died, Lü Meng recommended Cai Yi to Sun Quan to replace Gu Shao. Sun Quan laughed and asked Lü Meng, "Are you trying to be like Qi Xi?" He heeded Lü Meng's suggestion.

Tolerating Gan Ning

Lü Meng was unhappy with Gan Ning, a general under Sun Quan, because of his violent and murderous ways. There was one incident where Lü Meng was so furious with Gan Ning that he wanted to kill him. Gan Ning also infuriated Sun Quan on a number of occasions when he defied his lord's orders. When Lü Meng heard about it, he told Sun Quan: "The Empire has yet to be pacified. Fierce generals like Gan Ning are hard to come by. You should tolerate him." Sun Quan heeded Lü Meng's advice and treated Gan Ning generously. In return, Gan Ning served Sun Quan faithfully until his death.

Appraisal
Sun Quan once said: "A person improves as he grows older. Lü Meng and Jiang Qin are two excellent examples. They have obtained wealth and glory, yet they are willing to pick up reading and scholarly pursuits. They view material wealth lightly and value righteousness." On another occasion, he said: "When Ziming was young, I said he was someone who didn't give in to adversity, he was indeed courageous but only so. When he grew older, he became more knowledgeable and resourceful, and was second to Gongjin, but less capable in debate and literary arts as compared to Gongjin. When he defeated and captured Guan Yu, he did better than Lu Zijing."Chen Shou, who wrote Lü Meng's biography in the Sanguozhi, commented on him as follows: "Lü Meng was courageous and witty, decisive and well-versed in military strategy. Deceiving Hao Pu and capturing Guan Yu – those were his finest moments. Initially, he was rash and reckless, but eventually he managed to exercise self-restraint. He possessed the magnanimity of a great statesman and was not a mere warrior! Sun Quan's comments on Lü Meng, both positive and negative, were befitting, hence I included them in this record."

In Romance of the Three Kingdoms
Lü Meng appears as a character in the 14th-century historical novel Romance of the Three Kingdoms, which romanticises the historical events before and during the Three Kingdoms period. His death is dramatised in chapter 77 of the novel.

Sun Quan and his subjects are celebrating their conquest of Jing Province, with Lü Meng receiving the highest honour. During the banquet, Guan Yu's spirit suddenly possesses Lü Meng, grabs Sun Quan and shouts, "Green-eyed brat! Purple-bearded coward, do you still recognise me?" Sun Quan's subordinates immediately rush forth to save their lord. The possessed Lü Meng shoves Sun Quan away and sits on his seat. With a furious expression on his face, he booms, "Since defeating the Yellow Turban rebels, I have fought in wars for over 30 years. But I lost my life because you used an evil scheme against me. I can't feast on your flesh when I was still alive, but I can still seize Lü Meng's soul after death! I am Guan Yunchang, the Marquis of Hanshou Village." Sun Quan and the others are so terrified that they sink to their knees. Lü Meng collapses and dies, bleeding from seven body orifices. Everyone is traumatised by the scene they witnessed.

In popular culture

Lü Meng is featured as a playable character in Koei's Dynasty Warriors and Warriors Orochi video game series. In the games, his name is spelled as "Lu Meng" without the diaeresis in the "U" in "Lu". He also appears in all instalments of Koei's strategy game series Romance of the Three Kingdoms.

The fictional character Ryomou Shimei of the anime and manga series Ikki Tousen is based on Lü Meng.

See also
 Lists of people of the Three Kingdoms

Notes

References
 Citations from the Sanguozhi Citations from the Sanguozhi zhu Other citations

 Chen, Shou (3rd century). Records of the Three Kingdoms (Sanguozhi).
 
 Luo, Guanzhong (14th century). Romance of the Three Kingdoms (Sanguo Yanyi).
 Pei, Songzhi (5th century). Annotations to Records of the Three Kingdoms (Sanguozhi zhu).
 Sima, Guang (1084). Zizhi Tongjian''.

178 births
220 deaths
Chinese duellists
Generals under Sun Quan
Han dynasty generals from Anhui
Han dynasty politicians from Anhui
Officials under Sun Quan
Political office-holders in Anhui
Political office-holders in Hubei
Political office-holders in Hunan
Politicians from Fuyang
Sun Ce and associates